George Glaister (18 May 1918 – 1966) was an English professional footballer who played as a left winger. Glaister made a total of 158 appearances in the Football League between 1946 and 1952, scoring 30 goals.

Career
Born in Bywell, Glaister began his career with North Shields, and guested for Manchester United and Watford during the Second World War. He later played in the Football League for Blackburn Rovers, Stockport County, Halifax Town and Accrington Stanley. Glaister later played for Welsh club Bangor City. He also played nine times for Gloucester City.

References

1918 births
1966 deaths
English footballers
North Shields F.C. players
Manchester United F.C. wartime guest players
Watford F.C. wartime guest players
Blackburn Rovers F.C. players
Stockport County F.C. players
Halifax Town A.F.C. players
Accrington Stanley F.C. (1891) players
Bangor City F.C. players
Gloucester City A.F.C. players
English Football League players
Association football wingers
Date of death missing